Chamaesyrphus caledonicus is a Palearctic hoverfly.

Description
Very similar to other Chamaesyrphus For identification see references.

Distribution and biology
From Norway to Sweden, Finland, Scotland, Northern France, European Russia Germany (Bavaria). The habitat is Pinus sylvestris and taiga forest and sheltered coastal dune or heath systems. Flowers visited include Calluna vulgaris, Mentha, Saxifraga, Solidago virgaurea. Flies from July to October dependent on altitude and latitude.

References

External links
 Images representing Chamaesyrphus caledonicus 

Diptera of Europe
Eristalinae
Taxa named by James Edward Collin
Insects described in 1940